Rudno  is a village in the administrative district of Gmina Nowa Sól, within Nowa Sól County, Lubusz Voivodeship, in western Poland.

The village has a population of 450.

References

Rudno